United Nations Security Council Resolution 68, adopted on February 10, 1949, resolved that the United Nations General Assembly Resolution 192 be transmitted to the Commission for Conventional Armaments for action according to its terms.

The resolution was passed with nine votes, while the Ukrainian SSR and Soviet Union abstained.

See also
United Nations Security Council Resolution 77
List of United Nations Security Council Resolutions 1 to 100 (1946–1953)

References
Text of the Resolution at undocs.org

External links
 

 0068
Arms control
February 1949 events